is a 2002 Japanese film directed by Akihiko Shiota that released theatrically on 18 January 2003. It features Tsuyoshi Kusanagi (of the pop group SMAP) and Yūko Takeuchi in the lead role.

Plot
Set in the city of Aso in Kumamoto Prefecture, the film begins with scenes of individuals immediately after they have experienced unexplained and mysterious resurrection. One man and woman are uncovering long untouched musical instruments in a daze, and in one case a young boy finds himself alone in the forest, having suddenly reappeared after vanishing years earlier.

Eventually a representative from the Japanese Ministry of Welfare named Heita Kawada (Kusanagi) appears. It is his job to investigate this phenomenon, which begins to be seen not in just the two isolated cases, but in various locations around the city. He discovers on his way to his first meeting with the boy that  the child's DNA has been found to match that of a boy who disappeared years earlier (through a match with the umbilical cord saved by the mother), though the child should biologically be now in middle age. This evidence suggests the cases of resurrection occur in such a way that the resurrected person reappears at the same age that he or she supposedly died.

Kawada, with his team of investigators, meets and interviews those who are purported to have reappeared after death, some of whom have been dead many years. The investigators also interview the families of the resurrected, who have aged (some significantly) since the death of the person who has now reappeared.  In the case of the young boy, his mother has grown into an old woman, in other circumstances a youthful wife has reappeared to rejoin a husband now well into middle age.

The movie follows Kawada as he wrestles with the impossibility of the claims, which nevertheless seem to be based on empirically sound evidence. Kawada himself, a native of Aso, also reconnects with his old friend Aoi (Takeuchi), who shares with him a bitter memory of the death of Kawada's friend (and Aoi's lover) Shunsuke (Yusuke Iseya).

Cast
 Tsuyoshi Kusanagi as Heita Kawada
 Yūko Takeuchi as Aoi Tachibana
 Yuriko Ishida as Reiko
 Show Aikawa as Shuhei
 Keiichi Yamamoto as Hideya Nakajima
 Yoshikazu Toshin as Yuichi Nakajima
 Hideo Takamatsu as Haruo Tsuda
 Misaki Ito as Sachiko
 Masami Nagasawa as Naomi Morishita
 Shibasaki Kou as RUI
 Ichihara Hayato as Yamada
 Iseya Yusuke as Shunsuke

References

External links
 

2002 films
Japanese romantic fantasy films
Films set in Japan
2000s Japanese-language films